Agazzano is a comune (municipality) in the Province of Piacenza in the Italian region Emilia-Romagna, located about  northwest of Bologna and about  southwest of Piacenza.  

Agazzano borders the following municipalities: Borgonovo Val Tidone, Gazzola, Gragnano Trebbiense, Pianello Val Tidone, Piozzano.

References

Cities and towns in Emilia-Romagna
Articles which contain graphical timelines